is a professional Go player.

Takuji became a professional in 1995, was promoted to 7 dan in 2002 and reached 200 career wins in 2003.

Promotion record

References

External links
 Nihon Ki-in profile 

1979 births
Japanese Go players
Living people
Sportspeople from Gifu Prefecture
People from Tokyo